Amy Dahan-Dalmédico is a French mathematician, historian of mathematics, and historian of the politics of climate change.

Education and career
Dahan earned a doctorate in mathematics in 1979 and taught mathematics at the University of Amiens until 1983, when she became a researcher for the CNRS. She has also taught at the École Polytechnique, School for Advanced Studies in the Social Sciences, and Université libre de Bruxelles.
She earned a second doctorate in the history of mathematics in 1990, and is an emeritus member of the Alexandre Koyré Center for Research in the History of Science and Technology.

Books
Dahan is the author of:
Une histoire des mathématiques: routes et dédales (with Jeanne Peiffer, Études Vivantes, 1982). Translated into English by Sanford Segal as History of Mathematics: Highways and Byways (American Mathematical Society, 2010). Also translated into German as Wege und Irrwege — Eine Geschichte der Mathematik (Birkhäuser, 1994) and into Russian as Пути и лабиринты: Очерки по истории математики (Mir, 1986).
Mathématiques au fil des âges (with J. Dhombres, R. Bkouche, C. Houzel, and M. Guillemot, Bordas, 1987)
Mathématisations: Augustin-Louis Cauchy et l'École Française (Éditions du Choix, 1992)
Jacques-Louis Lions, un mathématicien d'exception: entre recherche, industrie et politique (Éditions La Découverte, 2005)
Les modèles du futur: changement climatique et scénarios économiques, enjeux scientifiques et politiques (Éditions La Découverte, 2007)
Gouverner le climat ? 20 ans de négociations internationales (with Stefan C. Aykut, Presses de Sciences Po, 2015)

She is the editor of:
La Formation polytechnicienne, 1794–1994 (with Bruno Belhoste and Antoine Picon, Dunod, 1994)
La France des X. Deux siècles d'histoire (with Bruno Belhoste, Dominique Pestre, and Antoine Picon, Economica, 1995)
Changing Images in Mathematics: From the French Revolution to the New Millennium (with Umberto Bottazini, Routledge, 2001).

References

Year of birth missing (living people)
Living people
Women mathematicians
French historians of mathematics